Hybridoneura picta is a moth in the family Geometridae. It is found in the north-eastern Himalayas, New Guinea and Queensland, as well as on Borneo, Rotuma Island, New Caledonia and Samoa.

The wingspan is about 20 mm. The forewings are indigo-blackish and the hindwings are ochreous yellow-brown.

References

Moths described in 1901
Eupitheciini